Oggy or Oggie may refer to:

 Cornish pasty, also called oggy or oggie in the Westcountry of England
 Oggy and the Cockroaches, a franchise and the name of a long-running popular animated slapstick series
Oggy Oggy, a spinoff focusing on Oggy made for younger audiences
Oggy and the Cockroaches: Next Generation, a reboot of the original series for the same age range as the original (around 6 to 14)
 Steve Ogrizovic (born 1957), Coventry City goalkeeper, also known as Oggy

See also
 Oggy Oggy Oggy, a British chant
Aussie Aussie Aussie, Oi Oi Oi